Robotic unicycle or unicycle robot can mean:
 a self-balancing unicycle
 a unicycle cart, an idealised two-wheeled robot cart moving in a two-dimensional world, used as an example in control theory problems